Clontarf Football Club is an Irish rugby union club based in Clontarf, Dublin. The club plays in Division 1A of the All-Ireland League.

History

Origins and early history
Having played firstly in a field at the bottom of Vernon Avenue, then on a site currently used by Dublin Bus as a depot, the club moved to Castle Avenue  in 1896. The "Bull emblem" used in the logo is that of the district — Cluain Tarbh, which translates as "the meadow of the bull". The red and blue colors are used by most sporting clubs in the area. The official club title is Clontarf Football Club rather than Clontarf Rugby Football Club. The explanation for this gives an insight into the rich history of the club — the club was formed before the establishment of the Irish Rugby Union.

The minutes of early club meetings show that the members used the Boat Club premises as changing rooms, and that goal posts were erected each Saturday morning and taken down after the match. The club was also approached by a local group who wished to play Gaelic Football on Sundays, and it was agreed to make the pitch available provided the footballers dismantled the goalposts after their matches.

In 1902, Clontarf was admitted to Senior Ranks — Leinster League — and in the following year reached the final of the Leinster Club Senior Cup, but they were beaten by Landsdowne one goal (5 points) to one try (3 points).

Separate and shared facilities
Since 1896, the grounds at Castle Avenue have been jointly occupied by Clontarf Cricket Club and the rugby club. Until 1947, both games were played on the same ground, and the wicket was fenced off in the winter. In 1982, following a disastrous fire which destroyed the bar and lounge, an agreement was reached between both clubs to go their separate ways. Subsequently, each club was provided with separate premises and the use of a common main bar and hall for each club's season.

Playing highlights
One of the club's notable moments was the defeat of the Athletic Rugby Football Club from New Zealand in 1966. It was the only defeat during their world tour. Among the teams played were Blackheath from England, and Cardiff of Wales. Athletic was captained by I.N. McEwan. This win is still regarded as one of Clontarf's greatest rugby feats.

Other highlights of the club's history include the winning of the Leinster Club Senior Cup in 1936 a feat which was to elude Clontarf teams for another 63 years until the much so sought after cup was returned to Castle Avenue in April 1999. However, the intervening years were not without success as various teams representing the Club won leagues and cups in the 1940s, 1950s, 1960s and 1970s. But it has been the last two decades of the Millennium that have witnessed some of Clontarf's proudest moments with the winning of the Leinster Floodlight Competition in 1989, 1990,1997 and 1998, the All Ireland Floodlight Competition in 1990, and the All Ireland League Division II in 1996/97. Since attaining Division 1status in 1997, Clontarf has maintained its position as one of the top twelve Clubs in Ireland. It has reached three All Ireland League division one finals, two of them to record winners Shannon. The club has produced many professional rugby players such as Cian Healy, Emile Prior and Brian O'Driscoll, Tadgh Furlong, Matt D'Arcy, Michael Noone, and most recently Joey Carbery.

In 2014, Clontarf won the All-Ireland League for the first time in the club's history, topping the table by a point, after a nail-biting finish which saw Clontarf beat Ballynahinch at Castle Avenue while Old Belvedere lost to Garryowen, giving Clontarf the title. Four days after this victory, the same Clontarf side faced the world-famous Barbarians F.C. to mark the 1000 year anniversary of the Battle of Clontarf. Clontarf were winners on the day, running out 43–42.

In the community
On a local level the club runs a "mini" rugby team and Youth Rugby is of large importance to the club, which has invested a lot of time and energy in this section. The club has swept the boards of mini rugby over recent seasons in home and international competitions.  For the 2018/2019 season, a Girls Youth team was set up and trains twice a week at the club.

The club has had a close association with the local St Paul's College, Raheny and Mount Temple Comprehensive School, as well as Belvedere College in central Dublin, for many years. The club also has a strong active social committee, with theme nights, awards balls, golf outings and Tag Rugby runs during the summer months.

Teams
Clontarf have teams from senior level down as young as under-8. At senior level there are five teams, the firsts play in the AIL Division 1, while the rest of the senior teams play in the Leinster Metropolitan Leagues. In 2007/2008 the first team won the Leinster League cup beating St Mary's College in the final. They were also a runner-up in the J1 Section A league, and runners-up in the J4 league. The J2 team won the J2 section B gaining promotion to J2 section A.  In 2014/2015, the J4 team won the Leinster Branch Metro League Division 6 title and won promotion to division 5.  The J6 team won the 2016/2017 Leinster Branch Metro League Division 11 title and won promotion to division 10.

2013/14 Squad
Full-backs: Darragh Fitzpatrick, Timmy McCoy
Wings: Mick McGrath, Max McFarland, Ciaran Butler
Centres: Evan Ryan, Conor Keegan, Killian Lett, Collie O'Shea, Dan Hanratty
Out-halves: David Joyce, Noel Reid
Scrum-halves: Sam Cronin, Peter Du Toit
Front-rows: Ian Hirst, Tadhg Furlong, Royce Burke-Flynn, David Hegarty, Keith Donoghue, Cian Healy
Hookers: Bryan Byrne, Cian Culleton, Cathal O'Flynn, 
Second-rows: Ben Reilly, Conor O'Keefe, Eoghan Browne, Tom Byrne, Mick Kearney
Wing-forwards: Simon Crawford, Adrian D'arcy, Karl Moran, 
Number 8s: Martin Garvey, Tony Ryan,

Achievements
 All-Ireland League Winners 2014, 2016. Runners up 2013, 2017
 Leinster Club Senior Cup Winners 1936, 1999, 2002
 Metropolitan Cup Winners 2012

International players
 Mick McGrath - plays for the Ireland national rugby sevens team
 Cian Healy - plays for Ireland and British and Irish Lions
 Tadhg Furlong - plays for Ireland and British and Irish Lions
 Joey Carbery - plays for Ireland
 Noel Reid - plays for Agen and formerly Ireland

References

External links
 http://www.clontarfrugby.com/
 AIB League Div 1A Info

 
Rugby clubs established in 1876
Irish rugby union teams
Rugby union clubs in Dublin (city)
Senior Irish rugby clubs (Leinster)
1876 establishments in Ireland